René de Chazet, full name René André Polydore Balthazar Alissan de Chazet, (23 October 1774 – 23 August 1844) was a French playwright, poet and novelist.

Short biography 
The son of an annuities controller, parent of Mackau, the ambassador of Naples, he accompanied him to Italy in 1792 and returned to France only in 1797. He collaborated with many newspapers and became known for his numerous plays, many of which written in collaboration with Charles-Augustin Sewrin. These plays were given in the most important Parisian stages of the first half of the XIXe century: Théâtre des Variétés, Comédie-Française, Théâtre du Palais-Royal, Théâtre du Vaudeville etc.

He competed in 1808 at the Académie française and won the first runner with his Éloge de Pierre Corneille. In 1814, he was pensioned by Louis XVIII, made a chevalier de la Légion d'honneur and appointed librarian of the king, then Finance receiver, a position he lost in 1830 when the regime fell.

Works 
He wrote 436 plays including:

1793: La Ruse villageoise, opéra comique in 1 act, in prose and in vaudevilles
1794: Le mot de l'énigme, vaudeville in 1 act, with Désaugiers and Lafortelle
1797: Arlequin journaliste, comedy in 1 act, en prose, mingled with vaudevilles, with Emmanuel Dupaty and Jean-Baptiste Mardelle
1797: Il faut un état, ou La revue de l'an six, proverbe in 1 act, in prose and in vaudevilles, with Jean-Michel-Pascal Buhan and François-Pierre-Auguste Léger
1797: Les français à Cythère, vaudeville, with Auguste Creuzé de Lesser and Emmanuel Dupaty
1798: Le Déménagement du salon, ou le Portrait de Gilles, comédie-parade in 1 act and in vaudevilles, with Noël Aubin, Dupaty et Léger
1799: La journée de Saint-Cloud, ou Le dix-neuf brumaire, divertissement-vaudeville in 1 act and in prose, with Armand Gouffé and Léger
1799: Champagnac et Suzette, comédie-vaudeville in 1 act
1799: Le Buste de Préville, impromptu in 1 act and in prose, with Dupaty
1799: Deux pour un, comedy in 1 act, mingled with vaudevilles, with Francis
1799: Il faut un état, proverbe in 1 act, with Léger
1800: Éloge de Cailly père
1800: Finot, proverbe archi-bête in 1 act
1800: La Lyre d'Anacréon, choix de romances, vaudevilles, rondes de table et ariettes
1800: Racine ou la Chute de Phèdre, comedy in 2 acts and on verse, mingled with vaudevilles, with Sewrin
1801: L'Hôtel garni, ou la Revue de l'an IX, comédie-vaudeville in 1 act, with Dieulafoy
1801: La Revue de l'an huit, suite de la Revue de l'an six, comédie-vaudeville in 1 act, with Dieulafoy and Gouffé
1801: Philippe le Savoyard, ou l'Origine des ponts-neufs, divertissement in 1 act and in prose mingled with vaudevilles, with Georges Duval and Armand Gouffé
1801: Le joueur d'échecs, vaudeville in 1 act, with Benoît-Joseph Marsollier des Vivetières
1802: 11, 76, 88, ou le Terne de Gonesse, vaudeville anecdote in 1 act and in prose, with Michel Dieulafoy and Jean-Baptiste Dubois
1802: Le Concert aux Champs-Élysées, vaudeville in 1 act, with Lafortelle
1802: Le Salomon de la rue de Chartres ou les Procès de l'an dix, revue épisodique, vaudeville in 1 act, with J-B Dubois
1802: La Première nuit manquée, ou Mon tour de garde, comédie-vaudeville in 1 act, with Dupaty
1802: Molière chez Ninon, ou La lecture de Tartufe, with J-B Dubois
1802: Le Mariage de Nina-Vernon, suite de la Petite ville, et des Provinciaux à Paris, comedy in 1 act and in prose, with Dieulafoy and J-B Dubois
1802: Un tour de jeune homme, anecdote in 1 act, with léger
1802: Étrennes à Geoffroy
1803: L'Amour et l'argent, ou le Créancier rival, comedy in 1 act, in prose, mingled with vaudevilles, with Lafortelle and Marc-Antoine Désaugiers
1803: Le Portrait de Juliette, vaudeville in 1 act, with Dupaty
1803: Cassandre aveugle, ou le Concert d'Arlequin, comédie-parade in 1 act, mingled with vaudevilles, with Théophile Marion Dumersan and Charles-François-Jean-Baptiste Moreau de Commagny
1803: Le Vin, le jeu et les femmes, ou les Trois défauts, comedy in 1 act, mingled with vaudevilles
1804: L'Amant soupçonneux, comedy in 1 act, in verse, with A.-M. Lafortelle
1804: Caponnet, ou l'Auberge supposée, vaudeville in 1 act, with Francis
1804: L'École des Gourmands, vaudeville in 1 act, with Francis and Lafortelle
1804: Ossian cadet, ou les Guimbardes, parody of the Bardes , vaudeville in 3 acts, with Dupaty
1804: Folie et raison, comedy in 1 act, with Sewrin
1804: Le Médecin de Palerme, comedy in 1 act, mingled with vaudevilles, with Sewrin
1804: L'hôtel de Lorraine, proverbe in 1 act, with Lafortelle
1804: La Leçon conjugale, ou l'Avis aux maris, comedy in 3 acts and in verse, with Sewrin
1804: Les Vélocifères, comédie-parade in 1 act, mingled with vaudevilles, with Charles-François-Jean-Baptiste Moreau de Commagny
1805: La fille jokey, vaudeville in 1 act, with Lafortelle
1805: Janvier et Nivôse, étrennes in vaudeville, with Sewrin
1805: La Laitière de Bercy, comédie anecdotique in 2 acts and in prose, mingled with vaudevilles, with Sewrin
1805: Éloge de La Harpe
1805: M. de Largillière, ou Mon Cousin de Dreux, comedy in 1 act, with Sewrin
1806: Les petites marionnettes ou La loterie
1806: Roquelaure, comedy in 1 act, mingled with vaudevilles
1806: La Belle hôtesse, comédy in 1 act, mingled with vaudevilles, with Léger
1806: La Petite métromanie, comedy in 1 act and in prose, mingled with vaudevilles
1806: Racine, comedy in 2 acts, with Sewrin
1806: Les Petites marionnettes, ou la Loterie, comedy in 1 act and in prose, mingled with vaudevilles
1806: Mademoiselle Gaussin, comedy in 1 act, mingled with vaudevilles
1806: Dubelloy, ou les Templiers, vaudeville in 1 act, with Lafortelle
1806: Le Politique en défaut, comedy in 1 act and in verse, with Sewrin
1806: La Duègne et le valet, comedy in 2 acts and in vaudevilles, with Sewrin
1806: Lundi, mardi et mercredi, ou Paris, Melun et Fontainebleau, comedy in 3 days and in vaudevilles, with Sewrin
1806: Le Chemin de Berlin, ou Halte militaire, divertissement-impromptu mingled with vaudevilles, with Sewrin
1807: La famille des lurons, vaudeville in 1 act, with Sewrin
1807: La famille des innocents ou Comme l'amour vient, comedy in 1 act, with Sewrin
1807: Pauvre Jacques, vaudeville, with Sewrin
1807: La Guerre et la paix, comedy in 3 acts
1807: L'Impromptu de Neuilly, divertissement in 1 act
1807: Romainville, ou la Promenade du dimanche, vaudeville grivois, poissard et villageois, in 1 act, with Sewrin
1807: L'Intrigue en l'air, comedy in 1 act, mingled with vaudevilles, with Sewrin
1807: François Ier, ou la Fête mystérieuse, comedy in 2 acts and in verse, mingled with ariettes, with Sewrin
1807: La Journée aux enlèvemens, comedy in 2 acts and in prose, mingled with vaudevilles, with Sewrin
1807: La Ligue des femmes ou le Roman de la rose, comédie anecdotique in 1 act, in prose mingled with vaudevilles, with Ourry
1808: Les Acteurs à l'épreuve, vaudeville épisodique in 1 act, with Charles-Augustin Sewrin
1808: Les Bourgeois campagnards, comedy in 1 act mingled with vaudevilles, with Sewrin
1808: Le Mari juge et partie, comedy in 1 act and in verse, with Ourry
1808: La Comédie au foyer, Épilogue en vaudevilles
1808: Odes couronnées le 20 janvier à la loge des Neuf-sœurs
1808: Habits, vieux galons, comedy in 1 act, mingled with vaudevilles, with Sewrin
1808: Ordre et désordre, comedy in 3 acts and in verse, with Sewrin
1808: Éloge de Pierre Corneille
1809: A bas Molière, comedy in 1 act, mingled with vaudevilles
1809: M. Asinard ou Le Volcan de Montmartre, folie in 1 act, mingled with couplets, with Ourry
1809: La Leçon de l'oncle, ou Il était tems !, comedy in 1 act and in prose, mingled with vaudevilles, with Sewrin
1809: Esprit de l'Almanach des Muses depuis sa création jusqu'à ce jour
1809: L'Écu de six francs, ou l'Héritage, comedy in 1 act and in prose, mingled with couplets, with Sewrin
1809: Le Caporal Schlag, ou la Ferme de Muldorf, one-act play, mingled with couplets, with Sewrin
1809: Le fils par hasard, ou Ruse et folie, comedy in 5 acts, in prose, with Ourry
1810: Les baladines, folie in 1 act, in prose, mingled with couplets
1810: Les Commères, ou la Boule de neige, comedy in 1 act and in prose, mingled with vaudevilles, with Sewrin
1810: Les Commissionnaires, ou Récompense honnête, comedy in 1 act and in prose, mingled with couplets, with Ourry
1810: La Cendrillon des écoles, ou le Tarif des prix, comédie-vaudeville in 1 act, in prose, with J-B Dubois
1810: Le Bouquet de roses, ou le Chansonnier des grâces
1810: Le Jardinier de Schoenbrunn, ou le Bouquet de noces, comedy
1810: Le Mai d'amour, ou le Rival complaisant, comedy in 1 act and in prose, mingled with couplets, with Ourry
1810: Monsieur Grégoire ou Courte et bonne
1810: Charles et Emma, ou les Amis d'enfance, with August Lafontaine
1810: Coco Pépin, ou la Nouvelle année, étrennes in 1 act, mingled with vaudevilles, with Sewrin
1810: La Double méprise, comedy in 1 act, in prose
1810: La Fête du château, bouquet en vaudevilles
1811: Le Billet de loterie, comedy in 1 act, with Léger
1811: Les Hommes femmes, folie in 1 act mingled with couplets, with Ourry
1811: Les Orgues de Barbarie, comedy in 1 act and in prose, mingled with couplets, with Sewrin
1811: L'Officier de quinze ans, divertissement in 1 act
1811: La Grande famille, ou la France en miniature, divertissement in 1 act and in vaudevilles
1811: Le Chantier de Saardam, ou l'Impromptu hollandais, divertissement
1812: L'Art de causer, épître d'un père à son fils
1812: La Famille mélomane, comédy in 1 act, mingled with couplets, with Ourry
1812: Les Russes en Pologne, tableau historique depuis 1762 jusqu'à nos jours
1812: Je m'émancipe, comédie-vaudeville in 1 act, with J-B Dubois
1812: Les Filles à marier, ou l'Opéra de Quinault, comedy in 1 act, mingled with couplets, with Antoine Simonnin
1813: La Ci-devant jeune femme, comedy in 1 act, mingled with couplets, with Simonnin
1812 Les Poètes en voyage, ou le Bouquet impromptu, vaudeville in 1 act, with Désaugiers
1814: Bayard à Mézières, opéra comique in 1 act, with Dupaty
1814: Lecoq, ou les Valets en deuil, comedy in 1 act mingled with couplets, with Simonnin
1814: La Cabale au village, comedy in 1 act, mingled with couplets, with Simonnin
1814: La Batelière du Loiret, comedy in 1 act, mingled with vaudevilles, with Maurice Ourry
1816: Chacun son tour, ou l'Écho de Paris, divertissement villageois in vaudevilles, with Marc-Antoine Désaugiers and Michel-Joseph Gentil de Chavagnac
1817: Les Trois Journées, ou Recueil des différens ouvrages que l'auteur a eu l'honneur d'adresser, au nom de la Garde nationale, à Sa Majesté et à S. A. R. Monsieur, pour l'anniversaire des 12 avril et 4 mai 1814 et du 8 juillet 1815
1817: Tableau des élections, depuis 1789 jusqu'en 1816, suivi de Quelques idées sur les élections prochaines
1817: Les deux Macbeth impromptu
1818: Les Femmes officiers, ou Un jour sous les armes, comedy in 1 act mingled with vaudevilles, with J-B Dubois
1818: La Statue de Henri IV, ou la Fête du Pont-Neuf, tableau grivois in 1 act, with Désaugiers, Michel-Joseph Gentil de Chavagnac and Joseph Pain
1819: M. Partout, ou le Dîner manqué, tableau-vaudeville in 1 act, with Désaugiers and Léger
1819: La robe feuille morte, one-act play
1820: Éloge historique de... Charles-Ferdinand d'Artois, duc de Berry
1820: La nuit et la journée du 29 septembre 1820, ou Détails authentiques de tout ce qui s'est passé le jour de la naissance de monseigneur le duc de Bordeaux
1820: Le Berceau du prince, ou les Dames de Bordeaux, à-propos vaudeville in 1 act, with Nicolas Brazier, Marc-Antoine Désaugiers, Jean-Baptiste Dubois and Michel-Joseph Gentil de Chavagnac
1821: Les Arts rivaux, intermède
1821: Un dimanche à Passy, ou M. Partout, tableau-vaudeville in 1 act, with Désaugiers and Léger, 1821
1821: Le concert d'amateurs, comedy in 1 act, with Brazier
1822: Relation des fêtes données par la ville de Paris et de toutes les cérémonies qui ont eu lieu dans la capitale à l'occasion de la naissance et du baptême de Mgr le duc de Bordeaux
1822: L'Inauguration de la statue de Louis XIV, ode
1822: Les Royalistes à la Chaumière
1822: Le Matin et le soir, ou la Fiancée et la mariée, comedy in 2 acts, mingled with couplets, with Armand d'Artois and Emmanuel Théaulon
1822: L'Écarté, ou Un lendemain de bal, comédy in 1 act, mingled with vaudevilles, with Jacques-André Jacquelin and Maurice Ourry
1823: Le Deux Mai ou la Fête de Saint-Ouen, divertissement in 1 act
1823: La France et l'Espagne, ou les Deux familles, intermède
1823: Les Femmes de chambre, vaudeville in 1 act, with Sewrin
1824: Le Conciliateur, ou Trente mois de l'histoire de France
1824: Louis XVIII à son lit de mort, ou Récit exact et authentique de ce qui s'est passé au château des Tuileries, les 13, 14, 15 et 16 septembre 1824
1829: Des mœurs, des lois et des abus, tableaux du jour
1829: Mémoires posthumes, lettres et pièces authentiques touchant la vie et la mort de Charles-François, duc de Rivière
1834: La jolie voyageuse ou Les deux Giroux, anecdote contemporaine in 1 act, with Achille d'Artois and Joseph-Bernard Rosier
1836: Les chansons de Désaugiers, comedy in 5 acts mingled with couplets, with Frédéric de Courcy and Emmanuel Théaulon
1836: La Cour des miracles, chronique de 1450, vaudeville in 2 acts (from The Hunchback of Notre-Dame by Victor Hugo), with Jean-Pierre Lesguillon and Emmanuel Théaulon
1836: Du Pain et de l'eau, comédie anecdote in 1 act
1837: Charles X, esquisse historique
1837: Mémoires, souvenirs, œuvres et portraits
1840: Eudoxie ou Le meunier de Harlem
undated: Hymne à l'amitié, romance nouvelle with piano or harp
undated: Le Vingt-un janvier, chant funèbre
undated: Vive le roi ! ou le chant d'un français

Bibliography 
 François-Xavier Feller, Charles Weiss, Biographie universelle, 1848, p. 586-587 
 J. Goizet, A. Burtal, Dictionnaire universel du Théâtre en France et du théatre français, vol.2, 1867, p. 28-33 
 Dictionnaire de biographie française, vol.8, Letouzay, 1959, p. 962 
 David Chaillou, Napoléon et l'Opéra: La politique sur la scène (1810–1815), 2004

External links 
 René de Chazet on data.bnf.fr

19th-century French dramatists and playwrights
1774 births
Writers from Paris
1844 deaths